Nolo may refer to:

 Nolo, Milan, a district in the northeast of Milan
 Nolo (publisher), formerly known as Nolo Press, a publisher of legal self-help material
 Nolo, Pennsylvania, an unincorporated community in Indiana County, in Pennsylvania, USA
 Nolo contendere, a plea that can be entered in some courts
 A pub that serves only non-alcoholic and low-alcoholic beverages see